Jorge Cordero may refer to:

 Jorge Cordero (musician) (born 1952), Cuban singer, guitarist and percussionist
 Jorge Cordero (footballer) (born 1962), Peruvian footballer